The 2014 Charleston Battery season was the club's 22nd season of existence. It is the Battery's fifth consecutive year in the third tier of American soccer, playing in the USL Professional Division for their fourth season.

Background

Club 

Good people

Team management

Competitions

Preseason

Carolina Challenge Cup

USL Pro 

All times from this point on Eastern Daylight Saving Time (UTC-04:00)

Results summary

Results

Standings

2014 U.S. Open Cup Results

Statistics

Transfers

References 

2014 USL Pro season
Charleston Battery seasons
American soccer clubs 2014 season
2014 in sports in South Carolina